Śmiadowo  (German: Hochfelde) is a village in the administrative district of Gmina Borne Sulinowo, within Szczecinek County, West Pomeranian Voivodeship, in north-western Poland.

Before 1648, the area was part of Duchy of Pomerania, and from 1648 to 1945 it was part of Prussia and Germany. For the history of the region, see History of Pomerania.

References

Villages in Szczecinek County